The 2019 Kerry Senior Football Championship was the 118th edition of Kerry GAA's premier gaelic football tournament for senior teams in County Kerry, Ireland. The tournament consists of 17 teams (8 club teams and 9 divisional teams), with the winners representing Kerry in the Munster Senior Club Football Championship if they are a club team. If the winners are a divisional team the winners of the Kerry Club Football Championship represent the county.

The championship has a back-door format for the first two rounds before proceeding to a knock-out format. Generally, any team to lose two matches will be knocked out of the championship.

This was Kilcummin's return to the senior ranks after only a one year absence, meaning they will no longer provide players to the East Kerry District panel for this season. An Ghaeltacht (who were relegated to the I.F.C. for 2019) will provide the West Kerry Divisional side with players for the S.F.C. 

Dr. Crokes were the 2018 champions after they defeated Dingle in the final. 

Rathmore lost their 20-year senior club championship status after a surprising no show in the second half against neighbours Kilcummin.
Rathmore’s exit is all the more surprising in a season where they had beaten Dr. Croke's in the Senior Club Championship and topped Division 1 of the County League. However All-Ireland Intermediate champions Kilcummin had no desire to join the band of clubs who went up to senior only to come back straight down the following season.

Format Structure Change
8 club teams and 9 divisional teams (17 in total) will take part in this year's S.F.C. It was decided that only 8 divisional sides would take part in the competition proper so the 2 lowest ranked divisional sides from the previous 5 years would play off in a qualification match with the winner entering the draw for the 2019 County Championship proper.

Relegation (See below): The club team to be relegated from the Senior County Championship will be the same team to be relegated from the Senior Club Championship (The 8 senior clubs play off against each other in two pools in the Club Championship. The two teams that finished bottom of the Group Pools enter a relegation final. This loser will be relegated to the I.F.C. for 2020. Should a club reach the final of the County championship they will be exempt from the Relegation process in the Club championship).

The winner of the 2019 I.F.C. will be promoted to the 2020 Senior County and Club Championships.

Team Changes

The following teams have changed division since the 2018 championship season.

To S.F.C.
Promoted from 2018 I.F.C.
 Kilcummin  -  (Intermediate Champions)

From S.F.C.
Relegated to 2019 I.F.C.
 An Ghaeltacht

Participating Teams
The teams taking part in the 2019 Kerry Senior Football Championship are:

Championship Qualifier

It was decided that only 8 of the 9 Divisional Teams would play in the Senior Championship proper. To determine which team would be excluded, all divisional teams placed into an open draw. Two of these divisional sides were drawn to play in a Qualifying Round. The winner would proceed to Round 1 of the championship proper while the loser would exit the championship until the following year. The ranking system of previous years was abolished.

Rounds 1 to 3

Round 1

The sixteen remaining teams play in eight matches in Round 1. The winners proceed to Round 2A while the losers play in Round 2B.

Round 2

Round 2A
The eight winners from Round 1 play each other in this round. The winners proceed to the knock-out quarter finals while the losers play in Round 3.

Round 2B
The eight losers from Round 1 play each other in this round. The winners proceed to Round 3 while the losers are eliminated from the championship having lost two games.

Round 3
The four Round 2A losers (who won a game and lost a game) play the four Round 2B winners (who lost a game and won a game) in this round. The four winners progress to the knock-out quarter finals while the losers are eliminated from the championship.

Knock-Out Stage

Quarter-finals
The four Round 2A winners play the four Round 3 winners in the quarter-finals.

Semi-finals

Final

Relegation

The club team to be relegated from the Senior County Championship will be the same team to be relegated from the Senior Club Championship. The 8 senior clubs are placed into two groups containing four teams during the Club Championship. The teams to finish bottom of both groups will face off in the Relegation Final, with the loser being relegated to the I.F.C. for 2020. Should a club reach the final of the County championship they will be exempt from the Relegation process in the Club championship.

Championship statistics

Miscellaneous

 East Kerry win the title for the first time since 1999.
 East Kerry qualify for the final for the first time since 1999.
 Dr Crokes lose their first final since 2009, having won in their last seven appearances. 
 Rathmor lose their 20-year senior club championship status.

References

External links

Kerry Senior Football Championship
Kerry Senior Football Championship
Kerry SFC